Phendulani Sikhizane Hendrick "Phepsi" Buthelezi (born 30 May 1999) is a South African rugby union player who captains the  in Super Rugby and the Currie Cup and the  in the Rugby Challenge. He plays as a Loose forward.

Club rugby 
In the 2021 Currie Cup he is the Sharks captain.

International 
Buthelezi represented South Africa at youth level, playing for the South Africa Schools team in the 2017 Under-19 International Series and for the South Africa Under-20 team at the 2018 World Rugby Under 20 Championship.

References

External links
 

1999 births
Living people
People from Big Five Hlabisa Local Municipality
Zulu people
South African rugby union players
Rugby union flankers
Rugby union number eights
Sharks (rugby union) players
South Africa Under-20 international rugby union players
Sharks (Currie Cup) players
Rugby union players from KwaZulu-Natal